Dasa is a Sanskrit word found in ancient Indian texts such as the Rigveda and Arthasastra. The term may mean "enemy" or "servant," but Dasa or Das can also have the following connotations: "servant of God", "devotee," "votary" or "one who has surrendered to God." Dasa may be a suffix of a given name to indicate a "servant" of a revered person or a particular deity.

Dasa, in some contexts, is also related to dasyu and asura, which have been translated by some scholars as "demon", "harmful supernatural forces," "slave," "servant," or "barbarian," depending on the context in which the word is used.

Etymology 
Dāsa first appears in Vedic texts from the second millennium BCE. There is no consensus on its origins.

Karl Heinrich Tzschucke in 1806, in his translations of the Roman geographer Pomponius Mela, noted etymological and phonological parallels between dasa and the ethnonyms of the Dahae – Persian داها; Sanskrit Dasa; Latin Dahae; Greek Δάοι Daoi, Δάαι, Δᾶαι Daai and Δάσαι Dasai –  a people who lived on the south-eastern shores of the Caspian Sea in ancient times (and from whom modern Dehestan/Dehistan takes its name).

Monier Monier-Williams in 1899, stated that the meaning of dasa varies contextually and means "mysterious forces", "savages", "barbarians" or "demons" in the earliest layer of Vedic literature – in other contexts, is a self-effacing way to refer oneself as "worshipper" or "devotee aiming to honor a deity", or a "servant of god". In later Indian literature, according to Monier-Williams, usage of dasa is used to refer to "a knowing man, or a knower of the universal spirit". In the latter sense, dāsa is masculine, while the feminine equivalent is dāsi. Some early 20th Century translations, such as P. T. Srinivasa Iyengar(1912), translate dasa as "slave".

Kangle in 1960, and others suggest that, depending on the context, dasa may be translated as "enemy", "servant" or "religious devotee". More recent scholarly interpretations of the Sanskrit words dasa or dasyu suggest that these words used throughout the Vedas represents "disorder, chaos and dark side of human nature", and the verses that use the word dasa mostly contrast it with the concepts of "order, purity, goodness and light." In some contexts, the word dasa may refer to enemies, in other contexts it may refer to those who had not adopted the Vedic beliefs, and yet other contexts it may refer to mythical enemies in the battle between good and evil.

Dasa in Buddhist texts can mean  "servant". In Pali language, it is used as suffix in Buddhist texts, where Amaya-dasa was translated by Davids and Stede in 1925, as a "slave by birth", Kila-dasa translated as a "bought slave", and Amata-dasa as "one who sees Amata (Sanskrit: Amrita, nectar of immortality) or Nibbana".

According to Dr Bhimrao Ambedkar,  Regarding the Dasas, the question is whether there is any connection between the Azhi-Dahaka of the Zend Avesta. The name Azhi-Dahaka is a compound name which consists of two parts. Azhi means serpent, dragon and Dahaka comes from the root "Dah" meaning "to sting, to do harm" 

Michael Witzel compares the etymological root of dasa to words from other Indo-European languages that imply "enemy, foreigner", including the Avestan dahåka and dŋha, Latin dahi and Greek daai.

Asko Parpola in 2015, has proposed that dasa is related to the ancient Iranian and proto-Saka word daha, which means "man". This is contrasted with arya, the word for "man" used by, and of, Indo-Iranian people from Central Asia.

Identification of Dasa

As people 
Based on the Arya-Dasa conflict described in Rigvedic text, scholars have tried to identify the Dasa as a population in South and Central Asia.

Max Müller proposed that dasa referred to indigenous peoples living in South Asia before the arrival of the Aryans.

Michael Witzel in his review of Indo-Iranian texts in 1995, states that dasa in the Vedic literature represented a North Iranian tribe, who were enemies of the Vedic Aryans, and das-yu meant "enemy, foreigner." He notes that these enemies could have apparently become slaves if captured.

Asko Parpola states that dasa referred only to Central Asian peoples.  Vedic texts that include prayers for the defeat of the dasa as an "enemy people", according to Parpola, possibly refers to people from the so-called Bactria–Margiana Archaeological Complex (BMAC), who spoke a different language and opposed Aryan religious practices. Parpola uses archaeological and linguistic arguments to support his theory. Among the evidences cited were recent BMAC excavation results where forts in circular shapes were found, the shape described in the early parts of the Rigveda as the enemy forts of Indra. He also found that Rigvedic words starting with triple consonant clusters such as Bṛhaspati, must be loanwords from the unknown BMAC language.

As spiritual entity 

Authors like Sri Aurobindo believe that words like Dasa are used in the Rig Veda symbolically and should be interpreted spiritually, and that Dasa does not refer to human beings, but rather to demons who hinder the spiritual attainment of the mystic. Many Dasas are purely mythical and can only refer to demons. There is for example a Dasa called Urana with 99 arms (RV II.14.4), and a Dasa with six eyes and three heads in the Rig Veda.

Aurobindo commented that in the RV III.34 hymn, where the word Arya varna occurs, Indra is described as the increaser of the thoughts of his followers: "the shining hue of these thoughts, sukram varnam asam, is evidently the same as that sukra or sveta Aryan hue which is mentioned in verse 9. Indra carries forward or increases the "colour" of these thoughts beyond the opposition of the Panis, pra varnam atiracchukram; in doing so he slays the Dasyus and protects or fosters and increases the Aryan "colour", hatvi dasyun pra aryam varnam avat."

According to Aurobindo (The Secret of the Veda), RV 5.14.4 is a key for understanding the character of the Dasyus:

Agni born shone out slaying the Dasyus, the darkness by the light, he found the Cows, the Waters, Swar. (transl. Aurobindo)

Aurobindo explains that in this verse the struggle between light and darkness, truth and falsehood, divine and undivine is described. It is through the shining light created by Agni, god of fire, that the Dasyus, who are identified with the darkness, are slain. The Dasyus are also described in the Rig Veda as intercepting and withholding the Cows, the Waters and Swar ("heavenly world"; RV 5.34.9; 8.68.9). It is not difficult, of course, to find very similar metaphors, equating political or military opponents with evil and darkness, even in contemporary propaganda.

K.D. Sethna (1992) writes: "According to Aurobindo,(...) there are passages in which the spiritual interpretation of the Dasas, Dasyus and Panis is the sole one possible and all others are completely excluded. There are no passages in which we lack a choice either between this interpretation and a nature-poetry or between this interpretation and the reading of human enemies."

Hindu Texts

Rig Veda 
Dasa and related words such as Dasyu are found in the Rig Veda. They have been variously translated, depending on the context. These words represent in some context represent "disorder, chaos and dark side of human nature", and the verses that use the word dasa mostly contrast it with the concepts of "order, purity, goodness and light." In other contexts, the word dasa refers to enemies and in other contexts, those who had not adopted the Vedic beliefs.

A. A. Macdonell and A. B. Keith in 1912 remarked that, "The great difference between the Dasyus and the Aryans was their religion... It is significant that constant reference is made to difference in religion between Aryans and Dasa and Dasyu."

Dasa with the meaning of Barbarians 
Rig Veda 10.22.8 describes Dasyus as "savages" who have no laws, different observances, a-karman (who do not perform rites) and who act against a person without knowing the person.

Dasa with the meaning of Demons 
Within the Vedic texts, Dasa is the word used to describe supernatural demonic creatures with many eyes and many heads. This has led scholars to interpret that the word Dasa in Vedic times meant evil, supernatural, destructive forces. For example, Rigveda in hymn 10.99.6 states,

Dasa with the meaning of Servant 
Dasa is also used in Vedic literature, in some contexts, to refer to "servants", a few translate this as "slaves", but the verses do not describe how the Vedic society treats or mistreats the servants. R. S. Sharma, in his 1958 book, states that the only word which could possibly mean slave in Rigveda is dāsa, and this sense of use is traceable to four verses out of 10,600 verses in Rigveda, namely 1.92.8, 1.158.5, 10.62.10 and 8.56.3. The translation of word dasa to servant or slave varies by scholars. HH Wilson, for example, translates Dasa in Rigvedic instances identified by Sharma, as servant rather than slave, as in verse 10.62.10:

R. S. Sharma translates dasi in a Vedic era Upanishad as "maid-servant".

Aryan-Dasa conflict 

Hermann Oldenberg states that no distinction between historical events and mythology existed for the Vedic poets. For them, the conflict between the Aryans and Dasas extended into the realms of gods and demons with the hostile demon being on the same level as the hated and despised savages.

Bridget Allchin and Raymond Allchin suggest Indo-Aryans were not the only inhabitants of the region when they arrived to Sapta-Sindhava or land of seven Indus rivers and their encounter with Dasyu was not entirely peaceful.

Ram Sharan Sharma states that the Rig-Vedic society was primarily organized on basis of tribe, kin and lineage. The "Aryan" tribes mentioned by the Rig Veda therefore may not have been of the same ethnicity, but may have been united by a common language and way of life. He states that while it has been argued that Dasyu and Dasa were not non-Aryans, it is more true in the case of the latter. Further the Dasas are said to be organized into tribes called viś, a term used for Vedic people or tribes. The god Indra is said to be the conqueror of Dasas, who appear mostly human. There are more references to the destruction of Dasyus by Indra instead of Dasas. He is said to have protected the Aryan varna by killing them. The Aryans also fought between themselves. The god Manyu (deity) is invoked to overcome both Aryans and Dasyus. Indra is asked to fight against the godless Dasyus and Aryans, who are the enemies of his followers. (X, 88, 3 & XX, 36, 10).

The fight between Aryans and their enemies consisted mostly of fortresses and walled settlements of the latter. Both Dasas and Dasyus were in the possession of them. Sharma states that this reminds us of the later discovery of fortifications of Harappan settlements, though there is no clear archaeological evidence of mass-scale confrontation between Aryans and Harappans. He adds that the Aryans seemed to be attracted to their wealth over which a regular warfare took place. The worshiper in the Rig Veda expects that those who offered no oblation should be killed and their wealth be divided (I, 176, 4). However, it was the cattle which held the most importance to Aryans who were cattle-herders. For example, it is argued that Kikatas didn't need cows because they made no use of milk products in sacrifice.

Sacrifice played an important part in Aryan way of life, however the Dasyus or Dasas did not offer sacrifices. An entire passage in the seventh book of Rig Veda uses adjectives such as akratün, aśraddhān and ayajñān applied to Dasyus emphasizes their non-sacrificing character. Indra is asked to discriminate between them and the sacrificing Aryas. Sharma states that the word anindra (without Indra) may refer to Dasyus, Dasa and Aryan dissenters. Per the Aryan view, the Dasyus practiced black magic and Atharva Veda refers to them as evil spirits to be scared away from the sacrifice. The Atharva Veda states that the god-blaspheming Dasyus are to be offered as victims. The Dasyus are believed to be treacherous, not practicing Aryan observances, and are hardly human.

Tony Ballantyne states that Rig Veda depicts the cultural differences between the Aryan invaders and non-Aryans of Indus valley. He states that although the inter-Aryan conflict is prominent in its hymns, a cultural opposition is drawn between Aryans and the indigenous people of North India. According to him, it depicts the indigenous tribes such as the Pani and Dasas as godless, savage and untrustworthy. Panis are cattle thieves who seek to deprive Aryans of them. He states Dasas were savages, whose godless society, darker complexion and different language were culturally different from Aryans. They are called barbarians (rakshas), those without fire (anagnitra) and flesh-eaters (kravyad). The Aryas were on the other hand presented as noble people protected by their gods Agni and Indra. He adds that their names were extended beyond them to denote savage and barbarian people in general. He concurs that this continued into later Sanskritic tradition where dasa came to mean a slave while Arya meant noble.

Later Vedic texts 
The three words Dasa, Dasyu and Asura (danav) are used interchangeably in almost identical verses that are repeated in different Vedic texts, such as the Rig Veda, the Saunaka recension of Atharva veda, the Paippalada Samhita of the Atharva Veda and the Brahmanas text in various Vedas. Such comparative study has led scholars to interpret Dasa and Dasyu may have been a synonym of Asura (demons or evil forces, sometimes simply lords with special knowledge and magical powers) of later Vedic texts.

Sharma states that the word dasa occurs in Aitareya and Gopatha Brahmanas, but not in the sense of a slave.

Arthashastra 
Kautilya's Arthashastra dedicates the thirteenth chapter on dasas, in his third book on law. This Sanskrit document from the Maurya Empire period (4th century BCE), has been translated by several authors. Shamasastry's translation in 1915, Kangle's translation in the 1960s and Rangarajan's translation in 1987 all map dasa as slave. However, Kangle suggests that the context and rights granted to dasa by Kautilya, such as the right to the same wage as a free labourer and the right to freedom on payment of an amount, distinguish this form of slavery from that of contemporary Greece. Edmund Leach points out that the Dasa was the antithesis of the concept of Arya. As the latter term evolved through successive meanings, so did Dasa: from "indigenous inhabitant" to "serf," "tied servant," and finally "chattel slave." He suggests the term "unfreedom" to cover all these meanings.

According to Arthashastra, anyone who had been found guilty of nishpatitah (Sanskrit: निष्पातित, ruined, bankrupt, a minor crime) may mortgage oneself to become dasa for someone willing to pay his or her bail and employ the dasa for money and privileges.

According to Arthashastra, it was illegal to force a dasa (servant) to do certain types of work, to hurt or abuse him, or to force sex on a female dasa.

Buddhist texts 
Words related to dasa are found in early Buddhist texts, such as dāso na pabbājetabbo, which Davids and Stede translate as "the slave cannot become a Bhikkhu". This restriction on who could become a Buddhist monk is found in Vinaya Pitakam i.93, Digha Nikaya, Majjhima Nikāya, Tibetan Bhiksukarmavakya and Upasampadajnapti.

Other uses

Use of religious "devotees" 
In Tamil dasa is commonly used to refer to devotees of Vishnu or Krishna.

In Gaudiya Vaishnavism, devotees often use dasa (meaning servant of Krishna) as part of their names, as in Hari Dasa.

As a surname or byname 

Dasa or Das is also a surname or middle name found among Hindus and Sikhs, typically in northern half of India, where it literally means "votary, devotee, servant of God." For example, Mohandas Gandhi's first name, Mohandas, means servant of Mohan or Krishna. Also, the name Surdas means servant of Sur or Deva. In the past, many saints of the Bhakti movement added it to their names, signifying their total devotion or surrender to God.

Comparative linguistics 
Dasa and related terms have been examined by several scholars. While the terms Dasa and Dasyu have a negative meaning in Sanskrit, their Iranian counterparts Daha and Dahyu have preserved their positive (or neutral) meaning. This is similar to the Sanskrit terms Deva (a "positive" term) and Asura (a "negative" term). The Iranian counterparts of these terms (Daeva and Ahura) have opposite meanings.

Asko Parpola states the original Dasa is related to the Old Persian word Daha which also means "man", but refers specifically to a regional ethnic minority of Persia. Parpola contrasts Daha with Arya, stating that the latter also referred to "man" but specifically to the incoming Indo-Iranians from Central Asia. The Vedic text that include prayers to help defeat the "Dasa as enemy people", states Parpola, may refer to the wars of the Indo-Iranians against the bearers of the Bactria–Margiana Archaeological Complex (BMAC) culture. The latter spoke a different language and opposed Indo-Iranian religious practices. Parpola uses archaeological and linguistic arguments to support his theory, but his theory is controversial.

See also 
Dahae
Déisi
Mleccha
Adivasi

References 

 Sources

Further reading 
Bryant, Edwin: The Quest for the Origins of Vedic Culture. 2001. Oxford University Press. 
J. Bronkhorst and M.M. Deshpande. 1999. Aryan and Non-Aryan in South Asia. Ann Arbor: University of Michigan Press.
Hock, Hans. 1999b, Through a Glass Darkly: Modern "Racial" Interpretations vs. Textual and General Prehistoric Evidence on Arya and Dasa/Dasyu in Vedic Indo-Aryan Society." in Aryan and Non-Aryan in South Asia.
Iyengar, Srinivas. 1914. "Did the Dravidians of India Obtain Their Culture from Aran Immigrant [sic]." Anthropos 1–15.
Macdonell, A.A. and Keith, A.B. 1912. The Vedic Index of Names and Subjects.
 Parpola, Asko: 1988, The Coming of the Aryans to Iran and India and the Cultural and Ethnic Identity of the Dasas; The problem of the Aryans and the Soma.
Rg Veda 1854–57. Rig-Veda Samhita. tr. H.H. Wilson. London: H.Allen and Co.
Schetelich, Maria. 1990, "The problem of the "Dark Skin" (Krsna Tvac) in the Rgveda." Visva Bharati Annals 3:244–249.
 Sethna, K.D. 1992. The Problem of Aryan Origins. New Delhi: Aditya Prakashan.
Trautmann, Thomas R. 1997, Aryans and British India. Berkeley: University of California Press.
Witzel, Michael. 1995b, 325, fn, "Rgvedic History" in The Indo-Aryans of South Asia.

Sanskrit words and phrases
Slavery and religion